The 2021 FIA World Rally Championship-2 is the ninth season of the World Rally Championship-2, an auto racing championship for rally cars that is recognised by the Fédération Internationale de l'Automobile as the second-highest tier of international rallying. The category is open to cars entered by teams and complying with Rally2 regulations. The championship began in January 2021 with the Rallye Monte-Carlo and is due to conclude in November 2021 with Rally Monza, and will run in support of the 2021 World Rally Championship.

Mads Østberg and Torstein Eriksen were the defending 2020 drivers' and co-drivers' champions. Toksport WRT are the defending teams' champions.

Andreas Mikkelsen was crowned 2021 drivers' champion at the penultimate round despite not competing there. As he had used different co-drivers through the season a co-driver of a different crew would therefore become co-driver champion. Torstein Eriksen, consistent co-driver of Mads Østberg, was able to retain his championship title. Movisport became the teams' champion.

Calendar

Entries
The following teams and crews are competing in, or are expected to enter, the 2021 World Rally Championship-2:

In detail
M-Sport Ford WRT entered a Ford Fiesta R5 Mk. II for Adrien Fourmaux and Renaud Jamoul, the crew combining their WRC-2 campaign with a drive for M-Sport's main team in the WRC. Teemu Suninen and Mikko Markkula joined the WRC-2 effort in Croatia, alternating in the car with Fourmaux. Following Suninen leaving M-Sport before the Acropolis Rally, Fourmaux will leave WRC-2 as well to drive the rest of the season in the main category. A second Fiesta was entered for Martin Prokop and Michal Ernst in the Arctic Rally Finland. Ernst was replaced by Viktor Chytka in Portugal, having been originally meant to co-drive for Prokop in Lapland. Zdeněk Jůrka became Prokop's third co-driver of the season in Sardinia. Ernst is due to return to co-drive in Greece. The reigning JWRC champion Tom Kristensson joined the team in Croatia, co-driven by David Arhusiander.

Hyundai Motorsport N signed Oliver Solberg and Aaron Johnston signed for a two-year deal, the pair joining to compete alongside the crew of Ole Christian Veiby and Jonas Andersson. Veiby was however suspended from competing in the WRC for the rest of the year for breaching COVID-19 protocols in Portugal. Reigning WRC-3 champions Jari Huttunen and Mikko Lukka entered driving a third car for the team. Italian driver Andrea Crugnola was meant to drive in Sardinia with co-driver Pietro Ometto, but had to withdraw due to most of the Hyundai WRC-2 team having to quarantine following Portugal. Hyundai introduced a successor to the Hyundai i20 R5 known as the Hyundai i20 N Rally2 in Belgium. Teemu Suninen and Mikko Markkula will join Hyundai WRC-2 ranks for the penultimate round in Spain. 

The reigning teams' champions Toksport WRT signed former WRC works driver Andreas Mikkelsen and 2020 WRC-3 runner-up Marco Bulacia Wilkinson, with Ola Fløene and Marcelo Der Ohannesian respectively as co-drivers. Eyvind Brynildsen and Veronica Engan replaced Bulacia Wilkinson and Der Ohannesian for the round in Lapland following the latter crew being prevented from entering the event by visa issues. Elliott Edmondson will replace Fløene as Mikkelsen's co-driver starting from the Acropolis Rally.

Italian team Movisport joined the championship, entering a Volkswagen Polo GTI R5 for Nikolay Gryazin and Konstantin Aleksandrov, who left Hyundai after 2020. The team also entered a Škoda Fabia R5 for Enrico Brazzoli and Maurizio Barone in selected events. Barone was replaced by Danilo Fappani in Sardinia. Esapekka Lappi and Janne Ferm returned to the category, driving a second Volkswagen for Movisport in Lapland and Portugal. Gryazin and Aleksandrov will switch to a Ford Fiesta R5 Mk. II for the Acropolis Rally. After leaving M-Sport Teemu Suninen and Mikko Markkula will drive a Volkswagen for Movisport in Finland.

Portuguese team Sports & You entered a Citroën C3 Rally2 for the French crew of Eric Camilli and François-Xavier Buresi. Camilli was co-driven by Benjamin Veillas in Portugal.

Saintéloc Junior Team joined the championship, entering a Citroën C3 Rally2 for Sean Johnston and Alex Kihurani. The team will enter a second C3 in Greece for Canadian driver Leonid "Crazy Leo" Urlichich and British co-driver Tom Woodburn.

ALM Motorsport entered a Volkswagen Polo GTI R5 for Estonian Georg Linnamäe and Ukrainian Volodymyr Korsia. After being suspended due to breaching COVID-19 protocols, Korsia was replaced with Tanel Kasesalu for one round, before James Morgan became Linnamäe's permanent co-driver. Linnamäe will drive a Škoda Fabia Rally2 Evo in Greece.

Current WRC-2 champion Mads Østberg entered the new season in Croatia driving a Citroën C3 Rally2 for TRT World Rally Team. He is co-driven by Torstein Eriksen.

Changes

Technical regulations
Pirelli alone will supply tyres to all teams entering WRC-2 with the removal of Michelin and Yokohama as FIA approved tyre suppliers.

Sporting regulations
Competitors in the WRC-2 category will be awarded Power Stage bonus points for the first time.

Results and standings

Season summary

Scoring system
Points are awarded to the top ten classified finishers in each event. Power Stage points are also awarded in the drivers' and co-drivers' championships. A team has to enter two cars to score points in an event. Drivers and teams must nominate a scoring rally when they enter the event and the best six scores from seven nominated rallies will count towards the final classification. Registered drivers are able to enter additional rallies with Priority 2 status without scoring points.

FIA World Rally Championship-2 for Drivers

FIA World Rally Championship-2 for Co-Drivers

FIA World Rally Championship-2 for Teams

Notes

References

External links
  
 FIA World Rally Championship-2 2021 at eWRC-results.com

 
World Rally Championship-2